Vepris trifoliolata is a species of plant in the family Rutaceae. It is endemic to Cameroon.  Its natural habitats are subtropical or tropical moist lowland forests and subtropical or tropical moist montane forests. It is threatened by habitat loss.

References

trif
Endemic flora of Cameroon
Vulnerable flora of Africa
Taxonomy articles created by Polbot